Paul Chue (born 1947) is a former Papua New Guinean national representative rugby league player. Chue captained Papua New Guinea in their first ever test match against England in 1975. He is regarded as Kumul number one.

Biography
Chue was born in Papua New Guinea and took up rugby union in his school years at St Joseph's College, Hunters Hill in Sydney. He was the first boy of Asian heritage to make that school's rugby first XV when selected in 1963. Following school he studied commerce at the University of New South Wales.

Back in New Guinea Chue took to rugby league and in 1973 captained a Rabaul representative side. He made his sole national representative appearance for the Kumuls in their debut international match against England in Port Moresby in 1975. That match was played to celebrate the new nation's independence.

Chue's business career was with the PNG soft drink firm Pacific Industries Ltd founded by his father Gabriel Achun Chue. Paul Chue ran that business from 1968 and was later succeeded by his son Everett.

References

Living people
Papua New Guinean rugby league players
Papua New Guinea national rugby league team captains
Papua New Guinea national rugby league team players
Rugby league halfbacks
People educated at St Joseph's College, Hunters Hill
1947 births